The Mauritanian Progressive Union (UPM) was a political party in pre-independence Mauritania.

History
The UPM was established in February 1948, in order to form a more conservative and regionally-based opposition to the Mauritanian Agreement party. The first election contested by the party was the 1951 French National Assembly elections, in which its candidate Sidi el-Mokhtar N'Diaye defeated the incumbent MP Horma Ould Babana. The following year Moktar Ould Daddah became party leader. The Territorial Assembly elections that year saw the UPM won 22 of the 24 seats.

N'Diaye was re-elected in the 1956 French elections, receiving 84% of the vote. The 1957 Territorial Assembly elections saw the party win 33 of the 34 seats.

In 1958 the party merged with the Mauritanian Agreement and the Gorgol Democratic Bloc to form the Mauritanian Regroupment Party.

References

Defunct political parties in Mauritania
Political parties established in 1948
Political parties disestablished in 1958